Satin, Texas is an unincorporated community in Falls County, Texas, 4 miles from Chilton. Satin is located in the northern part the county, on Farm to Market Road 434.

History
Satin was established in 1872 after a sawmill was built near the current site, on Cow Bayou. The population grew when the San Antonio and Aransas Pass Railway built tracks there between 1889 and 1892. Before Satin, the town was previously named Laguna and Cedar Point. Satin was supposedly the name of a railroad employee once a post office, which is still running today, was established in 1917. The population peaked at 200 residents in 1931, but dropped afterwards and fell to 86 by 2000.

References

External links
 Profile of Satin from the Handbook of Texas Online

Unincorporated communities in Falls County, Texas
Unincorporated communities in Texas